The UEFA Super Cup is an annual super cup football match organised by UEFA and contested by the winners of the two main European club competitions; the UEFA Champions League and UEFA Europa League. The competition's official name was originally the Super Competition, and later the European Super Cup. It was renamed the UEFA Super Cup in 1995, following a policy of rebranding by UEFA. It is not recognised as one of UEFA's major competitions.

From 1972 to 1999, the UEFA Super Cup was contested between the winners of the European Cup/UEFA Champions League and the winners of the European/UEFA Cup Winners' Cup. After the discontinuation of the UEFA Cup Winners' Cup, it has been contested by the winners of the UEFA Champions League and the winners of the UEFA Cup, which was renamed the UEFA Europa League in 2009.

The current holders are Champions League winners Real Madrid, who defeated Europa League winners Eintracht Frankfurt 2–0 in 2022. The most successful teams in the competition are Barcelona, Milan and Real Madrid, who have won the trophy five times each.

History

The European Super Cup was created in 1971 by Anton Witkamp, a reporter and later sports editor of Dutch newspaper De Telegraaf. The idea came to him in a time when Dutch total football was Europe's finest and Dutch football clubs were enjoying their golden era (especially Ajax). Witkamp was looking for something new to definitely decide which was the best team in Europe and also to further test Ajax's team, led by their star player Johan Cruyff. 

It was then proposed that the winner of the European Cup would face the winner of the European Cup Winners' Cup.

All was set for a new competition to be born. However, when Witkamp tried to get an official endorsement to his competition, the UEFA president turned it down.

The 1972 final between Ajax and Scotland's Rangers is considered unofficial by UEFA, as Rangers were banned from European competition due to the behaviour of their fans during the 1972 UEFA Cup Winners' Cup Final. As a result, UEFA refused to endorse the competition until the following season. It was played in two legs and was financially supported by De Telegraaf. Ajax defeated Rangers 6–3 on aggregate and won the first (albeit unofficial) European Super Cup.

The 1973 final, in which Ajax defeated Milan 6–1 on aggregate, was the first Super Cup officially recognised and supported by UEFA.

Although the two-legged format was kept until 1997, the Super Cup was decided in one single match because of schedule issues or political problems in 1984, 1986, and 1991. In 1974, 1981 and 1985, the Super Cup was not played at all: 1974's competition was abandoned because Bayern Munich and Magdeburg could not find a mutually convenient date, 1981's was abandoned when Liverpool could not make space to meet Dinamo Tbilisi, while 1985's was abandoned due to a ban on English clubs' participation preventing Everton from playing Juventus.

In the 1992–93 season, the European Cup was renamed the UEFA Champions League and the winners of this competition would face the winners of the Cup Winners' Cup in the European Super Cup. In the 1994–1995 season, the European Cup Winners' Cup was renamed the UEFA Cup Winners' Cup. The following season, the Super Cup also renamed the UEFA Super Cup.

After the 1998–99 season, the Cup Winners' Cup was discontinued by UEFA. The 1999 Super Cup was the last one contested by the winners of the Cup Winners' Cup. Lazio, winners of the 1998–99 UEFA Cup Winners' Cup, defeated Manchester United, winners of the 1998–99 UEFA Champions League, 1–0.

Since then, the UEFA Super Cup was contested between the winners of the UEFA Champions League and the winners of the UEFA Cup. The 2000 Super Cup was the first one contested by the winners of the UEFA Cup. Galatasaray, winners of the 1999–2000 UEFA Cup, defeated Real Madrid, winners of the 1999–2000 UEFA Champions League, 2–1.

In the 2009–10 season, the UEFA Cup was renamed the UEFA Europa League and the winners of this competition would continue to face the winners of the Champions League in the UEFA Super Cup.

In 2013, Chelsea became the first club to contest the Super Cup as holders of all three UEFA club honours, having entered as holders of the Cup Winners' Cup (1998), Champions League (2012), and Europa League (2013). Manchester United shared this honour in 2017 after their Europa League win, having qualified as Cup Winners' Cup holders in 1991.

After 15 consecutive Super Cups being played at Stade Louis II in Monaco between 1998 and 2012, the Super Cup is now played at various stadiums (similar to the finals of the Champions League and the Europa League). It was started with the 2013 edition, which was played at Eden Stadium in Prague, Czech Republic.

Starting in 2014, the date of the UEFA Super Cup was moved from Friday in late August, to Tuesday in mid-August, following the removal of the August international friendly date in the new FIFA International Match Calendar.

In 2020, the Super Cup final was originally scheduled to be played at the Estádio do Dragão in Porto, Portugal, on 12 August 2020. However, after the COVID-19 pandemic in Europe caused the postponements of the previous season's club finals, the UEFA Executive Committee chose to award the rescheduled Champions League final to Portugal, and postponed the match for 24 September 2020 and relocated the stadium to Puskás Aréna, Budapest.

Following discussions with its 55 member associations on 19 August 2020, the UEFA Executive Committee decided  on 25 August 2020 to use the final as a pilot match for which a reduced number of spectators, up to 30% of the capacity of the stadium, can be allowed in, and it became the first official UEFA match to have spectators since their competitions were resumed in August 2020.

Venues
The competition was originally played over two legs, one at each participating club's stadium, except in exceptional circumstances. For instance, in 1991 when Red Star Belgrade were not permitted to play the leg in their native Yugoslavia due to the war which was taking place at the time, so instead Manchester United's home leg was only played.

Since 1998, the Super Cup was played as a single match at a neutral venue. Between 1998 and 2012, the Super Cup was played at the Stade Louis II in Monaco. Since 2013 various stadiums have been used.

List of venues since 1998
1998–2012: Stade Louis II, Monaco
2013: Eden Aréna, Prague, Czech Republic
2014: Cardiff City Stadium, Cardiff, Wales
2015: Boris Paichadze Dinamo Arena, Tbilisi, Georgia
2016: Lerkendal Stadion, Trondheim, Norway
2017: Philip II Arena, Skopje, FYR Macedonia
2018: Lilleküla Stadium, Tallinn, Estonia
2019: Vodafone Park, Istanbul, Turkey
2020: Puskás Aréna, Budapest, Hungary
2021: Windsor Park, Belfast, Northern Ireland
2022: Olympic Stadium, Helsinki, Finland
2023: Karaiskakis Stadium, Piraeus, Greece

Prizes

Trophy

The UEFA Super Cup trophy is retained by UEFA at all times. A full-size replica trophy is awarded to the winning club. Forty gold medals are presented to the winning club and forty silver medals to the runners-up.

The Super Cup trophy has undergone several changes in its history. The first trophy was presented to Ajax in 1973. In 1977, the original trophy was replaced by a plaque with a gold UEFA emblem. The UEFA Champions League trophy weighs  and the UEFA Europa League trophy . It was designed and manufactured at the Bertoni workshop in Milan. The new model, which is a larger version of the previous trophy, was introduced in 2006 and weighs  and measures  in height.

Until 2008, a team which won three times in a row or five in total received an original copy of the trophy and a special mark of recognition. Since then, the original trophy has been kept exclusively by UEFA. Milan, Barcelona and Real Madrid have achieved this honour, winning a total of five times each, but the Italian team is the only one which was awarded the official trophy permanently in 2007. Barcelona and Real Madrid won their fifth title in 2015 and 2022, respectively, when the policy was no longer in place.

Prize money
As of 2020, the fixed amount of prize money paid to the clubs is as follows:
Runner-up: €3,800,000
Winner: €5,000,000

Rules
Currently, the rules of the UEFA Super Cup are that it is a single match, contested in a neutral venue. The match consists of two periods of 45 minutes each, known as halves. If the scores are level at the end of 90 minutes, two additional 15-minute periods of extra time are played. If there is no winner at the end of the second period of extra time, a penalty shoot-out determines the winner.

Each team names 23 players, 11 of which start the match. Of the 12 remaining players, a total of 3 may be substituted throughout the match. A fourth substitute is permitted if the match enters extra time. Each team may wear its first choice kit. If these clash, the previous year's Europa League winning team must wear an alternative colour. If a club refuses to play or is ineligible to play then they are replaced by the runner-up of the competition through which they qualified. If the field is unfit for play due to bad weather, the match must be played the next day.

Sponsorship
The UEFA Super Cup's sponsors are the same as the sponsors for the UEFA Champions League. The tournament's current main sponsors are (as of the 2022–23 season):
 FedEx
 Turkish Airlines
 Oppo
 Heineken N.V.
 Just Eat Takeaway
 Mastercard
 PepsiCo
 Sony
 PlayStation 5
Socios.com (United States only)

Adidas is a secondary sponsor and supplies the official match ball and referee uniform.

Individual clubs may wear jerseys with advertising, even if such sponsors conflict with those of the Super Cup. Only two sponsorships are permitted per jersey, plus that of the manufacturer, at the chest and the left sleeve. Exceptions are made for non-profit organisations, which can feature on the front of the shirt, incorporated with the main sponsor, or on the back, either below the squad number or between the player name and the collar.

Tickets
60% of the stadium capacity is reserved for the visiting clubs. The remaining seats are sold by UEFA through an online auction. There are an unlimited number of applications for tickets given out. The 5 euro administration fee is deducted from each applicant. There is no limit to the number of applications each individual can make.

Records and statistics

Winners

By nation

Notes

A.  No tournaments were held in 1974, 1981 and 1985.
B.  Excludes the first competition held in 1972, not organised nor recognised by UEFA as an official title.
C.  Includes West Germany clubs. No East Germany clubs appeared in a final.
D.  Both Soviet finals appearances were by a Ukrainian SSR club.

Individual records 
 Most wins by player: Paolo Maldini, Dani Alves, Dani Carvajal, Karim Benzema, Toni Kroos and Luka Modrić (4 wins each)
 Most matches by player: Roberto Donadoni and Alessandro Costacurta (8 matches each)
 Most wins by coach: Carlo Ancelotti (4 wins)
 Most finals by coach: Alex Ferguson and Carlo Ancelotti (4 finals each)
 All-time top scorers: Arie Haan, Oleg Blokhin, David Fairclough, Gerd Müller, Rob Rensenbrink, François Van Der Elst, Terry McDermott, Radamel Falcao and Lionel Messi (3 goals each)
 Fastest goal by a player: 1st minute (49 seconds), Diego Costa, against Real Madrid on 15 August 2018 
 Only player to have been named man of the match more than once: Lionel Messi (2009, 2015)

Hat-tricks

 Only player to have scored a hat-trick in a two-legged final: Terry McDermott, against Hamburger SV on 6 December 1977
 Only player to have scored a hat-trick in a single final: Radamel Falcao, against Chelsea on 31 August 2012

See also
List of association football competitions
List of UEFA Super Cup winning managers
List of UEFA Super Cup goalscorers
UEFA club competition records and statistics
Super Cup

References

External links

UEFA Super Cup
All time statistics with link to all results

 
Super Cup
Recurring sporting events established in 1972
1972 establishments in Europe